Trevor Lewis  (born 8 July 1933) is a British entomologist.  He was President of the Royal Entomological Society 1985-1986, and was Director of the AFRC Institute of Arable Crops Research, 1989–1993.  He was appointed a CBE in 1992.

References

Commanders of the Order of the British Empire
British entomologists
1933 births
Living people